Charles Elliot Rosen (born January 18, 1941) is an American author and former basketball player and basketball coach.

Career 
The 6' 8" Rosen played college basketball at Hunter College in New York City for three seasons (1959–62), setting school records for both scoring and rebounding, and earning most valuable player honors each season. 

He, along with Larry Brown and Art Heyman, played on the United States basketball team that won a gold medal at the 1961 Maccabiah Games.

After college, he played for Scranton and Camden in the old Eastern Basketball League, and taught English at Hofstra University on Long Island, New York.

From 1983–86, he was an assistant to Phil Jackson with the Albany Patroons of the Continental Basketball Association (CBA). He also served as head coach of the Patroons, as well as the CBA's Rockford Lightning, Oklahoma City Cavalry and Savannah Spirits.

He also served as head coach of the women's basketball team at the State University of New York at New Paltz, a four-year college located between Albany and New York City, and was men's head coach at Bard College during the 1979–80 season, which he chronicled in the book Players and Pretenders.

A native of the Bronx, New York, Rosen is the author of 16 books about basketball, including The First Tip Off, The House of Moses All-Stars, Barney Polan's Game, No Blood, No Foul, More Than a Game, The Pivotal Season, and The Wizard of Odds. Rosen was inducted into the Bronx Jewish Hall of Fame on November 28, 2018. Barney Polan's Game and The House of Moses All-Stars were both recognized as New York Times Notable Books, and Barney Polan's Game was recognized on the New York Times Book Review Editor's 1998 Recommended Summer Reading List.

He is known for his in-depth analysis and caustic views. His last article at FOXSports.com was dated June 29, 2011. Since then, his regular articles have been published at HoopsHype.com.

References

1941 births
Living people
Albany Patroons coaches
American sportswriters
Bard College
College men's basketball players in the United States
Hofstra University faculty
Hunter College alumni
American men's basketball players
Competitors at the 1961 Maccabiah Games
Maccabiah Games medalists in basketball
Maccabiah Games basketball players of the United States
Maccabiah Games gold medalists for the United States